Data Radio Channel (DARC) is a high-rate (16 kbit/s) standard for encoding data in a subcarrier over FM radio broadcasts. It uses a frequency of 76kHz, the fourth harmonic of the FM radio pilot tone.

DARC was approved as the All-European standard ETS 300 751 in 1997.

Applications 

DARC is well-suited to distributing traffic information because of its higher speed. In Japan, the VICS (Vehicle Information and Communication System) service has operated since 1996 in the Tokyo, Nagoya and Osaka metropolitan areas. In France, DARC has been tested for traffic message channel services.

In the United States, it was used to deliver stock market quotations by Digital DJ beginning in 1998.

In Munich, DARC is used to transmit public transport data to battery-powered signs in bus and tram stations.

Similar technologies
Other data broadcasting technologies include RDS and Microsoft's DirectBand.

References

Dietmar Kopitz, Bev Marks, RDS: The Radio Data System. Artech House Publishers, 1999. Sections 7.6.2 and 13.3.2.2.
Data Radio Channel (DARC) System, Electronic Industries Alliance, 1999. 41 pages

This article includes text from the corresponding article on the French Wikipedia.

External links
 
 Broadcast messages on the DARC side
 The DARC side of Munich - Hunting FM broadcasts for bus and tram display information

Radio technology
Data transmission
Telecommunications-related introductions in 1996